Saint Jack is a 1973 novel by Paul Theroux that was adapted into a 1979 film of the same name. It tells the life of Jack Flowers, a pimp in Singapore. Feeling hopeless and undervalued, Jack tries to make money by setting up his own bordello, and clashes with Chinese triad members in the process.

Film adaptation

A film adaptation directed by Peter Bogdanovich was released in 1979.

References 

1973 American novels
Novels by Paul Theroux
Novels about prostitution
Novels set in Singapore
American novels adapted into films
Works about prostitution in Singapore
Books with cover art by Paul Bacon
Fictional Singaporean people
Triad (organized crime)